The Sheriff of Dumbarton was historically the royal official responsible for enforcing law and order in Dumbarton, Scotland and bringing criminals to justice.  Prior to 1748 most sheriffdoms were held on a hereditary basis. From that date, following the Jacobite uprising of 1745, the hereditary sheriffs were replaced by salaried sheriff-deputes, qualified advocates who were members of the Scottish Bar.

Following a merger the post was retitled the Sheriff of Dumbarton and Bute in 1854. Following further reorganisations the post became the Sheriff of Stirling and Dumbarton in 1871 and the Sheriff of Stirling, Dumbarton and Clackmannan in 1881.

Sheriffs of Dumbarton 

William Bisset (1237)
Uilleam, Earl of Mar (1264-1266)
Walter Bailloch Stewart (1271-1288)
Duncan III, Earl of Fife (1288)
Alexander, Earl of Menteith (1289-?)
Walter Bailloch Stewart (1290)
James Stewart, 5th High Steward of Scotland (1293)
Alexander of Ledes (1296)
John de Menteith (1303-1308)
Malcolm Fleming, Earl of Wigtown (c.1309-1326)
John Dayleston (1359)
Malcolm Fleming, Earl of Wigtown (1367)
Walter Buchanan (1407)
Walter Stewart of Lennox (1416)
John Colquhoun of Luss (1425)
Robert Sempill - 1443 - Deputy
John Stewart, 1st Earl of Lennox (1488)
Matthew Stewart, 2nd Earl of Lennox (1494)

Sheriffs-Depute (1748)
James Colquhoun, 1775–1805 
John Glassford, c.1808 
John Campbell Colquhoun of Milligs, 1815–1854

Sheriffs of Dumbarton and Bute (1854)
Robert Hunter, 1854–1871 
 The sheriffdom was split in 1871, with Dumbarton becoming part of the new sheriffdom of Stirling and Dumbarton and Bute becoming part of the Sheriffdom of Renfrew and Bute.

See also
 Historical development of Scottish sheriffdoms

References 

Sheriff courts
sheriff
sheriff